Yannick N'Gog (born 21 May 1982 in Bourg-la-Reine, Hauts-de-Seine) is a French rugby union wing who went on a three-week trial with the Scarlets from SU Agen in 2008. He previously played for Bayonne and the French national Sevens team. He made his debut for the Scarlets on 9 January 2009, and became the first Frenchman ever to play for either Llanelli RFC or the Scarlets. N'Gog was born in France and is of Cameroonian descent.

References

External links
Profile at scarlets.co.uk

1982 births
Living people
People from Bourg-la-Reine
French rugby union players
French sportspeople of Cameroonian descent
Rugby union wings
Scarlets players
Sportspeople from Hauts-de-Seine
US Carcassonne players